Daneya Leigh Esgar is a former Democratic member of the Colorado House of Representatives. She represented District 46, which covered a portion of Pueblo County. She was first elected to her seat in 2014, succeeding Leroy Garcia.

In November 2020, Esgar's colleagues elected her to serve as majority leader of the Colorado House of Representatives for the two-year term beginning in January 2021.

Esgar is a lifelong Pueblo resident and an alumna of Colorado State University Pueblo. Before taking office, she worked as a journalist and community organizer. She is openly lesbian and is a member of the Colorado House's LGBT Caucus.

Esgar previously served as the House Majority Caucus Chair. She was also the chair of the Capital Development Committee, the vice chair of the House Health, Insurance, & Environment Committee, and a member of the House Agriculture, Livestock, and Natural Resources Committee and the House Transportation & Energy Committee. Additionally, she served as temporary Speaker of the House during the January 9th, 2023 Speaker election for the 74th General Assembly, making her the first openly gay representative to hold the Speaker's gavel in the state.

Esgar was the first openly gay state legislator to represent the Pueblo community in the General Assembly.

Elections
Esgar was first elected to the House of Representatives in 2014, winning with 52.2% of the vote against Republican opponent Brian Mater. She was reelected in 2016, in which she ran unopposed.

References

External links
 Official campaign website

1979 births
21st-century American women politicians
21st-century LGBT people
21st-century American politicians
Colorado State University Pueblo alumni
Democratic Party members of the Colorado House of Representatives
Journalists from Colorado
LGBT state legislators in Colorado
Living people
People from Pueblo, Colorado
Women state legislators in Colorado